Ardennes, a region of forested hills between Belgium, Luxembourg, Germany, France.
Ardennes or Ardenne, or variation, may refer to:

Places
 Ardennes (department), France; a subnational division
 Flemish Ardennes, or Ardennnes, Belgium, a region of Flanders
 Ardennes and Eifel, a mountainous set, including the Ardennes mountain range
 4849 Ardenne, an asteroid

People
 Agnes van Ardenne (born 1950), Dutch politician
 Justine Henin Hardenne (born 1982), tennis player
 Manfred von Ardenne (1907–1997), German scientist
 Paul Ardenne (born 1956), historian
 Sigfried, Count of the Ardennes (died 998), the first person to rule Luxembourg
 Ardennes-Verdun dynasty, a ruling house of Lorraine

Military
 Army of the Ardennes, French revolutionary army
 Battle of the Ardennes (1914), a battle of the First World War
 Battle of Ardennes (1940), see Battle of France
 Battle of Ardennes (1944), the Battle of the Bulge
 Ardenne Abbey massacre (1944), during the Battle of Normandy
 Operation Ardennes (2007), part of the Iraq War
 Ardennes American Cemetery and Memorial, a Second World War American military war grave cemetery

Facilities and structures
 Canal des Ardennes, between the Aisne and Meuse rivers
 Ardenne High School, St. Andrew, Jamaica
 Ardenne Abbey, former abbey in Calvados, France
 Château royal d'Ardenne (Ardennes royal castle), Belgium

Other uses
 Lancia Ardennes, 1930s car
 Beurre d'Ardenne (Ardenne butter), a style of butter
 Ardennes classics, cycling races
 Ardennes (horse), a breed of draft horse
 The Ardennes (film), a 2015 Dutch Belgian drama film

See also

 Champagne-Ardenne, a former region (subnational division) of France
 Alsace-Champagne-Ardenne-Lorraine, temporary name for Grand Est, a current region of France
 University of Reims Champagne-Ardenne, a French university
 Gare de Champagne-Ardenne TGV, rail station in Bezzanes, France
 TER Champagne-Ardenne, former rail network of Champagne-Ardenne
 
 
 
 Arden (disambiguation)